Alone (Sami) is a 2001 Croatian film directed by Lukas Nola, starring Leon Lučev and Nina Violić.

Sources

External links
 

2001 films
Croatian drama films
2000s Croatian-language films
Films directed by Lukas Nola
Post-apocalyptic films